Alejandro Zohn (born Alexander Zohn; born 8 August 1930, in Vienna – 2000, in Guadalajara) was a Mexican architect. He was a Holocaust survivor who grew up in Western Mexico.

Alejandro Zohn studied at the Universidad de Guadalajara, Mexico, graduating as an engineer in 1955 and as an architect in 1963. His abilities as an engineer are reflected in several bold and ingenious structures. Notable examples are the acoustic shell (1958) in Agua Azul Park, the Libertad Market (1959) and the 'Adolfo López Mateos' sports centre (1962), all in Guadalajara.

The market is especially noteworthy for its roof of hyperbolic paraboloids, which allow for wide areas without supports. He also built residential blocks, paying careful attention to details of interior functionality, the durability and maintenance of materials and residents’ individuality. The housing complex 'CTM-Atemajac' (1979), Guadalajara, is one of his main achievements in this area, comprising several buildings with brick facing, none more than five stories.

Among his numerous other designs in Guadalajara, the most notable are the Banco Refaccionario de Jalisco (1973), the Plaza del Sol, the 'Mulbar' shopping centre and car park and the Archivo del Estado de Jalisco building (1989). The latter is in exposed concrete and has a minimum of openings, emotional style and has affinities with the vernacular architecture of the Jalisco area.

References

External links 
 Wien Architektur
  Alejandro Zohn

Jewish architects
Austrian emigrants to Mexico
Mexican Jews
Austrian Jews
Artists from Guadalajara, Jalisco
People from Guadalajara, Jalisco
Artists from Vienna
1930 births
2000 deaths
Mexican people of Austrian-Jewish descent
20th-century Mexican architects
University of Guadalajara alumni